Hedera helix, the common ivy, English ivy, European ivy, or just ivy, is a species of flowering plant of the ivy genus in the family Araliaceae, native to most of Europe and western Asia. A rampant, clinging evergreen vine, it is a familiar sight in gardens, waste spaces, and wild areas, where it grows on walls, fences, tree trunks, etc. across its native and introduced habitats. As a result of its hardy nature, and its tendency to grow readily without human assistance, ivy attained popularity as an ornamental plant, but escaped plants have become naturalised outside its native range and grow unchecked in myriad wild and cultivated areas.

Synonyms include Hedera acuta, Hedera arborea ('tree ivy'), Hedera baccifera, and Hedera grandifolia. Other common names are bindwood and lovestone.

Etymology
The genus name  is the Classical Latin word for 'ivy', which is cognate with Greek  'to get, grasp', both deriving ultimately from Proto-Indo-European * 'to seize, grasp, take'. The specific epithet helix derives from Ancient Greek , 'helix', and from the Latin , 'spiral', first used around 1600. The binomial in its entirety thus has the meaning "the clinging plant that coils in spirals (helices)". The modern English ivy derives from Middle English , from Old English , deriving in turn from Proto-Germanic . The meaning is uncertain, but the word may be cognate with the Ancient Greek , referring to not Hedera helix, but the unrelated English lavender, or Lavandula angustifolia.

Description
It climbs by means of aerial rootlets with matted pads which cling strongly to the substrate. The ability to climb on surfaces varies with the plants variety and other factors: Hedera helix prefers non-reflective, darker and rough surfaces with near-neutral pH. It generally thrives in a wide range of soil pH with 6.5 being ideal, prefers moist, shady locations and avoids exposure to direct sunlight, the latter promoting drying out in winter.

The flowers are produced from late summer until late autumn, individually small, in  umbels, greenish-yellow, and very rich in nectar, an important late autumn food source for bees and other insects.

The fruit are purple-black to orange-yellow berries  in diameter, ripening in late winter, and are an important food source for many birds.

One to five seeds are in each berry, which are dispersed after being eaten by birds.

Subspecies
The three subspecies are:

H. h. helix - central, northern and western Europe, plants without rhizomes, purple-black ripe fruit,
H. h. poetarum Nyman (syn. Hedera chrysocarpa Walsh) (Italian ivy, poet's ivy) - southeast Europe and southwest Asia (Italy, Balkans, Turkey), plants without rhizomes, orange-yellow ripe fruit,
H. h. rhizomatifera McAllister - southeast Spain, plants rhizomatous, purple-black ripe fruit.

The closely related species Hedera canariensis and Hedera hibernica are also often treated as subspecies of H. helix, though they differ in chromosome number and so do not hybridise readily. H. helix can be best distinguished by the shape and colour of its leaf trichomes, usually smaller and slightly more deeply lobed leaves and somewhat less vigorous growth, though identification is often not easy.

Range

The range of European ivy is from Ireland northeast to southern Scandinavia, south to Portugal, and east to Ukraine and Iran and northern Turkey. In Britain, it is very common and widespread, but absent from the Isle of Man and Channel Islands

The northern and eastern limits are at about the  winter isotherm, while to the west and southwest, it is replaced by other species of ivy.

Cultivation

Ivy is widely cultivated as an ornamental plant. Within its native range, the species is greatly valued for attracting wildlife. The flowers are visited by over 70 species of nectar-feeding insects, and the berries eaten by at least 16 species of birds. The foliage provides dense evergreen shelter, and is also browsed by deer.

In Europe, it is frequently planted to cover walls and the Bavarian government recommends growing it on buildings for its ability to cool the interior in summer, while providing insulation in winter, as well as protecting the covered building from soil moisture, temperature fluctuations and direct exposure to heavy weather. Further uses include weed suppression in plantings, beautifying unsightly facades and providing additional green by growing on tree trunks.

However, ivy can be problematic. It is a fast-growing, self-clinging climber that is capable of causing damage to brickwork, guttering, etc., and hiding potentially serious structural faults, as well as harbouring unwelcome pests. Careful planning and placement are essential.

Cultivars
Over 30 cultivars have been selected for leaf traits such as yellow, white, variegated (e.g. 'Glacier'), and deeply lobed (e.g. 'Sagittifolia'), and other traits like purple stems and slow, dwarfed growth.

The following 16 cultivars have gained the Royal Horticultural Society's Award of Garden Merit: 

 'Angularis Aurea' 
'Buttercup' 
 'Caecilia' 
'Ceridwen' 
 'Congesta' 
 'Duckfoot' 
 'Glacier' 
 'Goldchild' 
'Golden Ingot' 
'Maple Leaf'  
 'Manda's Crested' 
 'Midas Touch' 
 'Parsley Crested' 
'Shamrock' 
 'Spetchley' 
'White Knight'

Toxicity and ethnomedical uses
Ivy berries are somewhat poisonous to humans, but ivy extracts are part of current cough medicines. In the past, the leaves and berries were taken orally as an expectorant to treat cough and bronchitis. In 1597, the British herbalist John Gerard recommended water infused with ivy leaves as a wash for sore or watering eyes. The leaves can cause severe contact dermatitis in some people. People who have this allergy (strictly a type IV hypersensitivity) are also likely to react to carrots and other members of the Apiaceae as they contain the same allergen, falcarinol.

Previous studies showed that the Hedera helix extract contains alpha- and beta-hederin (α-hederin and β-hederin), falcarinol, didehydrofalcarinol, rutin, caffeic acid, chlorogenic acid, emetine, nicotiflorin, hederasaponin B and hederacoside C. However, only three extracted components were detectable more than 1.5% in the European ivy leaves (hederacoside C 15.69%, chloro-genic acid 2.07%, and rutin 1.62%). Other components were detectable in very few amounts (< 1%) or not detectable in some studies.

Owing to the large number of saponins in the leaves and fruits of H. helix, it is mildly poisonous to animals like rabbits and can lead to anemia.

Invasive species

Like other exotic species, ivy has predominantly been spread to areas by human action. H. helix is labeled as an invasive species in many parts of the United States, and its sale or import is banned in the state of Oregon.

With a great capacity for adaptation, ivy will grow wherever development conditions and habitat similar to that of its European origins exist, occurring as opportunistic species across a wide distribution with close vicariant relatives and few species, indicating recent speciation.

Australia
It is considered a noxious weed across southern, especially south-eastern, Australia and local councils provide free information and limited services for removal. In some councils it is illegal to sell the plant.
It is a weed in the Australian state of Victoria.

New Zealand
H. helix has been listed as an "environmental weed" by the Department of Conservation since 1990.

United States
In the United States, H. helix is considered weedy or invasive in a number of regions and is on the official noxious weed lists in Oregon and Washington. Like other invasive vines such as kudzu, H. helix can grow to choke out other plants and create "ivy deserts". State- and county-sponsored efforts are encouraging the destruction of ivy in forests of the Pacific Northwest and the Southern United States. Its sale or import is banned in Oregon. Ivy can easily escape from cultivated gardens and invade nearby parks, forests and other natural areas via squirrels and birds.

British Columbia
Although popular as a winter holiday decoration, H. helix is invasive and is a pathogen alternate host in British Columbia.

Control and eradication
Once English Ivy is established it is very difficult to control or eradicate. If left untreated it will crowd out other ground cover plants and can choke out and kill shrubs and overstory trees.

Tested and successful methods of control are mechanical removal and chemical applications.

Damage to trees
Ivy can climb into the canopy of young or small trees in such density that the trees fall over from the weight, a problem that does not normally occur in its native range.
In its mature form, dense ivy can destroy habitat for native wildlife and creates large sections of solid ivy where no other plants can develop. It is also thought to be a reservoir for leaf scorch bacteria. However, the UK Woodland Trust considers that it does not damage trees and hence does not require removal. The ivy also blocks the sun from the trees that need it for photosynthesis.

Use as building facade green

As with any self-climbing facade green, some care is required to make best use of the positive effects: Ivy covering the walls of an old building is a familiar and often attractive sight. It has insulating as well as weather protection benefits, dries the soil and prevents wet walls, but can be problematic if not managed correctly.

Ivy, and especially European ivy (H. helix) grows vigorously and clings by means of fibrous roots, which develop along the entire length of the stems. These are difficult to remove, leaving an unsightly "footprint" on walls, and possibly resulting in expensive resurfacing work. Additionally, ivy can quickly invade gutters and roofspaces, lifting tiles and causing blockages. It also harbors mice and other creatures. The plants have to be cut off at the base, and the stumps dug out or killed to prevent regrowth.

Therefore, if a green facade is desired, this decision has to be made consciously, since later removal would be tedious.

Mechanism of attachment 
Hedera helix is able to climb relatively smooth vertical surfaces, creating a strong, long lasting adhesion with a force of around 300 nN. This is accomplished through a complex method of attachment starting as adventitious roots growing along the stem make contact with the surface and extend root hairs that range from 20 to 400 μm in length. These tiny hairs grow into any small crevices available, secrete glue-like nanoparticles, and lignify. As they dry out, the hairs shrink and curl, effectively pulling the root closer to the surface. The glue-like substance is a nano composite adhesive that consists of uniform spherical nanoparticles 50–80 nm in diameter in a liquid polymer matrix.  Chemical analyses of the nanoparticles detected only trace amounts of metals, once thought to be responsible for their high strength, indicating that they are largely organic. Recent work has shown that the nanoparticles are likely composed in large part of arabinogalactan proteins (AGPs), which exist in other plant adhesives as well. The matrix portion of the composite is made of pectic polysaccharides. Calcium ions present in the matrix induce interactions between carboxyl groups of these components, causing a cross linking that hardens the adhesive.

References

External links
 USDA information about Hedra helix including fire effects

helix
Flora of Asia
Flora of Europe
Garden plants
Medicinal plants of Asia
Medicinal plants of Europe
Plants described in 1753
Taxa named by Carl Linnaeus
Vines